Escadron de Chasse (Fighter Squadron 3/11 Corse) is a French Air and Space Force (Armée de l'air et de l'espace) fighter squadron currently stationed at BA 188 Djibouti Air Base .

The squadron is composed of three historic escadrilles (Flights), C46, SPA 69, and SPA 88, dating back decades and with many historical traditions.

Second World War
At the outbreak of the Second World War, Groupe de Chasse I/3 (GC I/3) was equipped with the Morane-Saulnier MS.406. After seeing combat during the Phoney War, GC I/3 relocated to southern France. While at Cannes-Mandelieu, the unit converted to the new Dewoitine D.520 fighter. When the Battle of France began in May 1940, it was the only unit to be operationally ready with the D.520, which it first took to battle on May 12 after hastily relocating to Wez-Thuisy. In late June 1940, as the collapse of the French armies was inevitable, GC I/3 crossed the Mediterranean to escape capture. Here it went under control of the Vichy government. After three of its pilots, including ace Marcel Albert, had defected to Gibraltar to join the Free French, the Germans requested GC I/3 to be disbanded. However, the unit was simply renamed GC III/3, using the designation of a squadron that had been disbanded the previous year. Under this guise, the unit briefly faced the Allies during Operation Torch.

After French forces in North Africa had sided with the Allies, the unit was re-christened GC 1/3 Corse and was re-equipped with Supermarine Spitfire fighters.

It then operated under the Royal Air Force, which referred to it as No. 327 (French) Squadron. No. 327 Squadron was active from 1 December 1943 until November 1945.

See also

 List of French Air and Space Force aircraft squadrons

References

Citations

Bibliography
 Halley, James J. The Squadrons of the Royal Air Force & Commonwealth 1918-1988. Tonbridge, Kent, UK: Air Britain (Historians) Ltd., 1988. .
 Jefford, C.G. RAF Squadrons, a Comprehensive Record of the Movement and Equipment of all RAF Squadrons and their Antecedents since 1912. Shrewsbury, Shropshire, UK: Airlife Publishing, 2001. .

 Rawlings, John D.R. Fighters Squadrons of the RAF and their Aircraft. London: Macdonald & Jane's (Publishers)Ltd., 1969 (New revised edition 1976, reprinted 1978). .

External links

 Squadron Histories for No.'s 310-347 Squadrons on RAFweb
 Squadron Histories for Nos. 326-328 Squadrons at Royal Air Force website

Fighter squadrons of the French Air and Space Force
Military units and formations established in 1939

fr:Escadron de chasse 3/11 Corse